Sergey Mitrofanovich Gorodetsky (– June 8, 1967) was a poet who lived in the Russian Empire and then the Soviet Union. He was one of the founders (together with Nikolay Gumilev) of "Guild of Poets". He was born in Saint Petersburg, and died in Obninsk.

Gorodetsky entered the literary scene as a Symbolist, developing friendships with Alexander Blok, Vyacheslav Ivanov, and Valery Briusov. Following his brief stint with Symbolists, Gorodetsky began to associate with younger poets, forming the Acmeist group with Nikolai Gumilev, Anna Akhmatova, and Osip Mandelshtam. Subsequently, abandoning yet another group, he welcomed the Bolshevik revolution as a Soviet poet.

References

External links
 English translations of 2 poems by Babette Deutsch and Avrahm Yarmolinsky, 1921
 English translations of 2 short poems
 The Poems by Sergey Gorodetsky (English)

Poets from the Russian Empire
Soviet poets
1884 births
1967 deaths